Pyotr Petrovich Sokolov (Russian: Пётр Петрович Соколов; 1821, Saint Petersburg - 2 October 1899, Saint Petersburg) was a Russian painter and illustrator.

Biography
He was the eldest son of the watercolor portraitist Pyotr Fyodorovich Sokolov. Although he received lessons from his father, he was largely self-taught until 1840, when he entered the Imperial Academy of Arts. He studied there for three years with his uncle, Karl Bryullov, as well as Pyotr Basin and Fyodor Bruni. He preferred hunting and genre scenes, but also did the occasional portrait.

From 1877 to 1878, he was a frontline correspondent in the Russo-Turkish War and was wounded at the Siege of Plevna. He was awarded the Cross of St. George for bravery. His paintings were shown widely. Among the events he participated in were the Centennial Exhibition in Philadelphia and the Exposition Universelle (1889), after which he was named an honorary member of the Société des Artistes Français. In 1893, he received the title of Academician.

He is, however, best known for his book illustrations; notably a collection of poems by Nikolay Nekrasov and Sketches from a Hunter's Album by Ivan Turgenev as well as Dead Souls by Nikolai Gogol, a popular work for illustrators. His brothers, Pavel and Alexander were also painters.

Illustrations for Sketches from a Hunter's Album

References

 The Sokolov Family, from the Brockhaus and Efron Encyclopedic Dictionary (in Russian). 1906, @ Russian WikiSource

External links

 ArtNet: More works by Sokolov.

1821 births
1899 deaths
Russian illustrators
19th-century painters from the Russian Empire
Russian male painters
Painters from Saint Petersburg
Genre painters
Recipients of the Cross of St. George
19th-century male artists from the Russian Empire